The TaskForceMajella (TFM) is an industry-funded geoscientific research project conducted between the years 1998 and 2005. The project involved numerous universities distributed worldwide, and was sponsored by a number of international major oil companies. The area of research was the Majella Mountain in Central Italy, regarded as an analogue of a faulted and fractured hydrocarbon reservoir as can be found in major provinces like the Middle East, Caspian Basin, Mediterranean Basin, and other areas. The scope was to obtain knowledge on the relation between fracture and fault generation, and all types of geological aspects of the evolution of the geological structure.

Introduction

The scope and mission of the Project TaskForceMajella (TFM) is to construct a model of the Montagna della Majella anticline structure as an analogue of a faulted and fractured carbonate reservoir similar to those in production and explored by the sponsors of the Project, Eni and Norsk Hydro (now merged into StaoilHydro) (e.g. Iran, Iraq, Libya, Canada, Caspian Sea area, etc.). The aim is to provide a predictive tool for the exploration and production of these prospects and reservoirs, which are characterized by the fact that their production is for a considerable amount controlled by the presence of fractures and faults.

The Montagna della Majella is a mountain massif in the Apennines, in Abruzzo, central Italy, at the boundary between the provinces of Chieti, Pescara and L'Aquila.

The TFM Project comprises a study of all geological aspects of the Montagna della Majella and aims at reconstructing a complete model of its geological evolution using both previous and newly collected data, and applying the latest technologies. The Project which can be considered as the largest of this kind ever conducted, comprises numerous Research Institutes and Universities distributed in Italy and other European countries and the United States, with a working team composed of over 100 collaborators such as technical personnel, University Professors and Research Assistants and students.

The structure and technical details which define the Project  were described in a Work Plan which was written in order to define the work schedule, technical specifications, responsibilities and financial specifications and was freely distributed amongst potential project partners . A general geological description can be found in the official but not freely available Eni Majella Field Guide , in the Official Field Guide of Central Italy of the Italian Geological Society . and in the book dedicated to the history of research in the area  .

Why Majella?
Mainly, six basic arguments are used to explain why the Majella Mountain structure was chosen as the study object of the TFM Project:

Accessibility
The Majella Mountain structure is located in central Italy, in an area of the National Park; numerous roads and mountain tracks provide access to 60% of the area, excluded the high mountain central sectors. The area is close to the Rome-Pescara highway, with less than 1 hour drive to the nearby international airport of Pescara, and 2 hours drive to the Roma airports.

Tectonic Structure and Dimension
The tectonic structure of the Majella is similar to many broad foreland anticlines in various hydrocarbon provinces, both in size, dimension and structural characteristics (few tens of kilometres long and wide).

Background knowledge
Some aspects of the Montagna della Majella anticline were previously studied by some scientific research groups, partly also in collaboration with oil companies such as Exxon, Lasmo and British Gas. A huge data base is present in literature regarding its sedimentary evolution, in studies by French and Swiss research groups. Previous to the TFM Project, in Italy, Torino and Pisa Universities have conducted ten years of geological research in the area during the nineties of the twentieth century, focussing mainly on sedimentary and stratigraphic aspects of the area.

Basin to Carbonate transition: Guarantee of facies variability
The presence inside the mountain of a major E-W trending platform-basin transition provides the possibility of evaluating fault and fracture networks in many different carbonate facies, ranging from tight platform carbonates to marl-chalk interbedded sequences and porous bioclastic grainstones, present inside the same tectonic structure, and therefore having gone through the same geological evolution.

Previous studies and degree of outcropping
Previous studies, conducted by research consortia mentioned above and during scouting field trips by Eni-Agip experts, had shown that a large amount of data regarding fracture and fault systems and their characteristics can easily be acquired in the area due to the excellent degree of outcropping.

The Majella Petroleum System
The northern part of the Majella Anticline is locally filled with hydrocarbon which indicates that the "Majella Petroleum System" was active throughout the Neogene and the Majella Anticline can thus be considered as an aborted hydrocarbon reservoir. The chemical characteristics of this oil was previously and extensively studies by Eni experts, and compared with source rocks of nearby oil fields . The oil in the Pescara Valley has been dug in open mines since ancient Roman times, and Eni is exploring and producing from subsurface satellite anticlines since the fifties of the previous century. Most of these small oil fields are at present depleted. See below for the description of one of the study sites of the Projects.

General organisational aspects

The Project was initialised in 1998 and managed throughout its project lifetime by Dr. J.P. van Dijk of the company Eni, through a round-table discussion at the National Conference of the Italian Geological Society (SGI) in Palermo in Sicily. All possible research institutes interested in participating in the Project presented themselves and a lively debate, also attended by Prof. Dr. Alberto Bally  who had worked in the area in the late forties and fifties, initiated the organisation of the working plan. Following that, the official start date was May 2000 when the project work plan was defined. Initial sponsor was Eni E&P Division (former Agip), followed by NorskHydro (After that Hydro O&G and now Statoil) which entered the Project in February 2001.

Partners and components
The university components were divided into five working groups (Mapping, Stratigraphy, Structure, Fracture and Modelling), each composed of various university representatives in a way that each university was part of different working groups.
The universities that were involved directly and indirectly are:

Torino University (Italy) (Prof. Livio Vezzani, Dott. Andrea Festa, Dott.ssa Anna D’Atri, Dott. Daniele Giordan, Dott.ssa Maria Estefania Sanchez Palomo, Dott. Giuseppe Mancari, Dott. Ivan Vanzo, Dott. Mojca Battistini, Dott.ssa Stefania Lucchesi)
D'Annunzio University of Chieti–Pescara (Italy) (Prof. Uberto Crescenti, Prof. Fernando Calamita, Dott. Alberto Pizzi, Dott. Giovanni Rusciadelli, Rusciadelli, Dott.ssa Maria Luisa Milia, Dott.ssa Camilla De Girolamo, Dott. Raffaele Montefalcone, Dott. Gabriele Pugliese, Dott.ssa Loretta Finocchio, Dott. Giuseppe Palmitesta, Dott. Michele Morsilli, Dott.ssa Giada Vighi, Dott. Vittorio Scisciani, Dott. Pino Catavitelli, Dott. Fiorenzo Fumanti, Prof. Sergio Rusi, Prof. Enrico Miccadei, Dott.ssa Chiavaroli)
Roma 1 University "La Sapienza" (Italy) (Prof. Ernesto Centamore, Dott.ssa Sabina Bigi, Dott. David Rossi, Dott.ssa Patrizia Costa Pisani, Dott.ssa Rinalda Di Stefano, Dott. Mario Del Castello, Dott. Joannes Pignatti, Dott. Raffaele Di Bella)
University Roma 3 (Italy) (Late Prof. Renato Fiuniciello, Prof. Maurizio Parotto, Prof. Domenico Cosentino, Dott.ssa Paola Cipollari, Dott.ssa Sveva Corrado, Dott. Giorgio Pipponzo, Dott. Vincenzo Pasquali, Dott. C. Fattori, Dott. T. Piacentini, Dott. S. Gambini, Dott. C. Berti, Dott. P. Pitzianti, Dott. P. Robustini, Dott. E. Gliozzi, Dott. L. Di Bella)
Pisa University (Italy) (Prof. Etta Patacca, Prof. Paolo Scandone, Dott. Donato Merola, Dott. Antonio Cascella, Dott. Ermanno Danese)
Camerino University (Italy) (Late Prof. Giuseppe Cello, Dott. Emanuele Tondi, Dott.ssa Maria Chiara Invernizzi, Dott. Luca Micarelli, Dott. Alessandro Zanni, Dott. Bruno Prugni, Dott. Leonardo Marchigiani, Dott.ssa Giordana Bellezza)
Perugia University (Italy) (Late Prof. Pialli, Prof. Giorgio Minelli, Dott. Mauro Foglietta (see below), Dott. Cristina Pauselli, Dott. Federico Costanzo, Dott.ssa P.T. Brunozzi, Dott. J. Braun, Dott. A. Frigeri)
CNR (Research Centre) Roma (Italy) (Dott. Gian Paolo Cavinato, Dott.ssa Francesca Giardina, Dott. Emiliano Di Luzio, Dott. Mario Tozzi, Dott. Alberto Di Ludovico, Dott. Davide Scrocca) Consiglio Nazionale delle Ricerche - CNR
CNR (Research Centre) Milano (Italy) (Dott. Corrado Magistroni)
ETH Zurich (Switzerland) (Prof. Dr. Daniel Bernoulli)
Free University of Amsterdam (VU) (the Netherlands) (Prof. Dr. Sierd Cloetingh, Prof. Dr. Dick Nieuwland
Stanford University (USA) (Prof. Dr. Atilla Aydin, Dr. Brita Graham, Dr. Marco Antonellini, Dr. Fabrizio Agosta)
Montpellier University (France) (Prof. Jean-Pierre Petit, Dott. Pascal Cortes, Dott. Loïc Bazalgette)
Liverpool University (United Kingdom) - Dublin University (Ireland) (Prof. Dr. John Walsh, Dr. Chris Bonson)
 Various universities - Mauro Foglietta (Reading University)

The Project benefitted from collaborations and support from regional and local administrations:
the "Regione Abruzzo",
three Provinces (Aquila, Pescara, Chieti),
the National Nature Park Majella ("Ente Parco Nazionale Majella"),
the Majella Park Mountain Rangers ("il Corpo Forestale"),
and various local administrations such as the Local Fireman Corps Section.

Synergy with other projects
A synergie was created with the technical activities performed in the Stanford Rock Fracture Project ("RFP", ran by Stanford University), and the GeoFracNet consortium ("GFN", ran by Montpellier University) and supported by the company GeoTER. These two projects had overlaps in research objectives though run in a completely different manner: The RFP tackled questions related to fault and fracture zones in different tectonic regimes but mainly in clastic sedimentary rocks, and was sponsored by a considerable amount of Oil Companies, whereas the GFN was sponsored by only a few companies and focussed on specific genetic relationships in different selected sites. Furthermore, between the three projects there was an overlap in industrial sponsors and stake holders (though Eni was in the privileged position of being the only company involved in all three of them). In this way, the Projects could mutually benefit from the results obtained, and provide suggestions for steering of their relative research activities.

Office
A technical office of the TFM was founded and is supported by the Ortona District Office of Eni (DORT) and based in the harbour area of Ortona in the SAF (Deep Water Survey Project) building.

Web Site
The web site https://web.archive.org/web/20051024074759/http://www.taskforcemajella.com/ was set up and was managed by Temars - Eni-Data, the former software company of Eni, based in Bologna. It was designed by Dott. Luca Benvenuti, and remained active until some years after the closure of the Project in 2006 .

Logistics
The logistic service of the Project was performed by Maria Lanzellotti, and was vital for the contacts with local, regional and national administrations for authorisations, contacts with supporting companies, logistics, organisations of meetings of Working Groups and conferences, public relations, etc. Furthermore, in the second stage of the Project, the Association SFERA managed numerous organisational aspects. The TFM web site and a special brochure designed to provide visibility to the Project, played important roles in the organisation and the success of the Project on local, regional and international scales.

Steering
The project was monitored by the sponsors through a steering committee, and accompanied and guided by a scientific committee (the president of the steering committee was Prof. U. Crescenti, in this period also the president of the Italian National Geological Society (SGI)).

Geological Map
The Geological Cartography Project (CARG) of the Italian National Geological Survey (SGN) of the Ministry of Environmental Control of the Italian national administration (Dott. B. Compagnioni, Dott. F. Galluzzo) was officially involved in the geological mapping group of the TFM Project in order to follow national standards of cartography and integrate the surface data with the official national geological map sheets of the area. Furthermore, and on the other hand, the project CARG benefitted from the technical specifications and experiences of the G-Map tool of the TFM Project. Other sinergies were created with the Italian National Seismic Monitoring Service (Dott.ssa Daniela di Bucci, Dott. Giuseppe Naso, Dott.ssa Roberta Giuliani, Dott.ssa Annamaria Blumetti).

Involvement
Eni E&P Division, based in San Donato Milanese (Italy), was technically involved in the Project in order to provide regional subsurface data sets (non sensible seismic and well data) for the construction of the regional geological model. Furthermore, the data were confronted with the deep crustal seismic profile which passed through the area, acquired in the CROP the Italian National CROP Project, which data were integrated in the construction of the regional geological model (Profile CROP 11a, 11b, 11c; Civitavecchia - Vasto; CROP references: Prof. Castellerin, Prof. Maurizio Parotto). The photogrammetrical survey engineering group of Eni was heavily involved in the three-dimensional monitoring of sites with specific interest and the analysis of three-dimensional fracture and faults networks at different scales (see below). A number of technical support companies provided the necessary local service.

Main Cartography and Database Support
Two main supporting items were set up which function and the technical work base for the project data base:
 The digital topographic cartography (by CGR Parma)
During the year 2000 a new stereophotogrammetrical digital topography was acquired by the Company CGR ("Compagnia Generale Ripreseaeree"), based in Parma (Italy). It is composed of a unique 1:10.000 topographic 3D digital vector based survey of the area, with accompanied high resolution colour Geotiff georeferenced aerial photographs.
 The data base management software: G-MAP (by TEMARS-ENI-Data Bologna)
A new GIS based system, called G-MAP (application tool in ESRI’s ArcView environment, now called ArcGIS), was designed by Dott. Luca Benvenuti of the Eni ITC Company Temars-Eni Data, based in Bologna (Italy), to incorporate all geological data collected in the project, and accompanied by a web-browse release. The software can be viewed as a forerunner of nowadays digital geological mapping systems and online map based storage environments like Google Earth and similar.

Main activities and some results

Cartography
All Working Groups of the Project have contributed to a completely new geological mapping of the Majella anticline. Each single outcrop was separately mapped and all data relative to the mapping are stored in the digital data base system G-MAP, especially designed for the Project.
The working group 'Stratigraphy' coordinated the stratigraphic aspects of the mapping, whereas the working group 'Structure' coordinated the collection of structural data. The working group 'Fracture' provided the structural field data collected, integrating them with other structural geological data.

A geological map of the Majella Mountain was compiled on a 1:25,000 scale which showed the distribution of the main stratigraphic units .

In addition to these field data, the G–MAP data base (see above) comprised all cartographic material (digital maps on various scales), location of all data collected in the Project such as the stereophotogrammetrical sites, sample sites, stratigraphic and sedimentological logs, and the various interpreted geological maps.

This map was vectorised and calibrated in three dimensions, using geological profiles available. The work was performed in Milan, by the architects Pasquale Femia and Antonio Sergi, in collaboration with Eni E&P and Interservice. The outcome was a complete 3D model of the area constructed in the software AutoCad of AutoDesk, and a series of 1:25,000 scale geological maps. The work can be regarded as the first step in the industrial process known as "Seismic to simulation", where from the available geophysical and geological information a model is constructed which is the basis of a dynamic reservoir simulation.

Stratigraphy
The working group 'Stratigraphy', led by Pisa University and coordinated by Pisa and Rome-I Universities, constructed a stratigraphic map of the Majella Mountain focussing on the carbonate succession. A new sequence stratigraphic scheme was built based on the field work, 25 sections were logged in detail (see e.g.) and about 4000 spot samples were analysed. The stratigraphic map was constructed in collaboration with the members of the field mapping working group 'Structure', using the main structural elements as a geometrical framework.

The codification of the new stratigraphic framework was used in the G-MAP data base system in order to define the stratigraphic reference for all structural geological data collected.

A new geological map of the Majella Mountain was compiled on a 1:25,000 scale which showed the distribution of these newly defined stratigraphic units .

Structure
The working group 'Structure', led by Chieti University and coordinated by Chieti and Rome-III University, constructed a structural map of the Majella mountain. This structural framework is accompanied by five structural cross-sections of the anticline, which together provide an overview of the internal structure of the Majella mountain. The Working Group furthermore performed a systematic analysis of kinematic data collected on fault surfaces (indications for type of movement and timing of the fault network). This resulted in a detailed framework for the deformation history of the Majella anticline, which shows the style of movement on various sets of faults and their relationships in time. In order to obtain a constraint on the type of stress field responsible for the deformations observed, a paleostress analysis using numerical inversion techniques was performed on the same kinematic data, and a palaeo-stress map was constructed.

Connected to the structural cartography and mapping, analyses was conducted regarding the slope stability of the area and the occurrence of large scale land-slides that occurred in (pre-)historical times.

Another fundamental piece of research performed during the project concerns the analysis of present-day uplift and subsidence rates of the area using remote sensing techniques such as Radar Interferometric techniques.

Fracture acquisition and modeling

The working group 'Fracture', led and coordinated by Camerino University, has examined the fracture network of the Majella anticline on various scales using different acquisition and analysis techniques. About 50 vertical and horizontal outcrop surfaces were scanned and properties (orientation, dimension, surface texture, aperture) of about 4500 fractures were measured. Additionally, 25 scan lines on main faults were measured in order to analyse the properties of the fault zones and their relation to the stratigraphy and structural setting. Furthermore, in collaboration with Eni SpA and Serma SrL personnel, data acquisition was performed on a number of selected sites using stereo-photogrammetrical techniques, which allowed the acquisition of three-dimensional data on the fault and fracture networks up to tens of metres scale. Using these techniques, about 120.000 fractures were measured at these selected sites.

Hundreds of smaller and larger areas were studied during the TFM Project, and three sites of particular interest are mentioned here:

The ancient Madonna della Mazza stone Quarry, located on the eastern central side of the mountain massif near the village Pretoro, was extensively studied by the various members of the project, on various scales and applying different type of data acquisition and analyses techniques. The quarry was identified in 1993 by an Eni scouting field trip. In 1995 it was extensively described for the first time and its potential for fracture studies was outlined . After these preliminary notes, the studies of the TaskForceMajella were performed (such as a complete 3D photogrammetrical survey), and the quarry became one of the favorite sites for a visit during many field excursions . For this purpose, the quarry was extensively cleaned and made available for visiting and studying, will all kinds of instruments, as part of the logistics activities of the TFM Project. During these numerous visits, the results of the TaskForceMajella Project were illustrated, and the quarry became well known as the site where deformation bands in carbonate rocks had been discovered and described for the first time . Studies on this quarry have continued throughout the following decades (see reference list below).

Another extensively studied site (where three-dimensional photogrammetrical surveys were also performed on various scales) regards the ancient Valle Romana bitumen quarry situated in the area of the village Lettomanoppello, where calcarenites partially impregnated with heavy oil testify that the Majella anticline can be regarded as a partially filled oil reservoir. This, still active quarry was identified in 1992 by an Eni field scouting as a potential study site. In 1995 it was extensively described for the first time . Studies that formed part of TaskForceMajella were carried out, following on these preliminary but exhaustive notes (The present owner Italcementi gave their permission, thanks to the extensive logistics efforts performed for the TFM Project). Amongst other, the quarry was covered by a complete topographic and 3D photogrammetrical survey on various scales. For obvious reasons, the quarry became one of the favorite sites visited on many field excursions . Studies on this quarry have continued throughout the following decades (see reference list below).

A site of intensive study was the Valle Santo Spirito, situated in the area of the village Fara San Martino. This area is characterised by steep canyons in strongly lithified platform carbonates which show characteristic deformation patterns. Basic observations and characterisation of the site were described by  Extensive photogrammetrical surveys at various scales were conducted in this area during the TFM Project.

The pain stacking analysis of all these data resulted in a number of major constraints on the relation between fracture network and anticline structure and evolution, and fault zones and mechanical Stratigraphy.

Numerical simulation and analogue modeling

The Working Group Modelling, led by the Research Centre CNR of Rome, has performed various types of modeling exercises, such as:
the construction of a regional subsurface model based on the interpretation and calibration of a number of composite seismic sections (Rome, Pisa and Chieti University),
the numerical modelling of the deformation history of the anticline (Eni and Perugia University) using Fracture mechanics related algorithms,
 a number of modeling exercises were performed to generate three-dimensional models of Discrete Fault and Fracture Networks  for different type settings (Camerino University, Eni, NorskHydro), which properties are used to populate dynamic simulators during the dynamic simulation of hydrocarbon reservoirs, and
the analogue modelling through sandbox experiments of the deformation history of the area (Amsterdam University).

These modelling exercises provide insight into the relationships between the deformation styles we observe today and the processes that are responsible for these end-results. In order to perform the numerical and analogue simulations, data had to be collected in order to describe the geomechanical properties of the various tectonostratigraphic units and environments that characterise the Majella anticline and its bordering area. Representative samples were collected by the various operational units of the Project and laboratory deformation experiments were performed in Eni and in NorskHydro mechanical laboratories.

See also

Area

 Abruzzo
 Apennines
 Majella
 Majella National Park

Geology

 Fault (geology)
 Fracture (geology)
 Fracture mechanics
 Geology
 Petroleum
 Petroleum industry
 Research and development

Notes

Sources - further reading
This is a series of references made to scientific works that treat the geoscience of the Majella Mountain, and publications related to the subjects treated in the TaskForceMajella Project.

Sources - TFM related papers
This list contains papers issued during and after the TaskForceMajella Project, which are the result of research conducted directly for the Project, in relation with the Project, and/or benefitting considerably of the activities of the Project, issued both during and after the Project.

 
 
 
 
 
 
 
 
 
 
 
 
 
 
 
 
 
 
 
 
 
 
 
 
 
 
 
 Citation Reference: 
 
 
  Download the original here: Alt URL

External links
 The National Park of the Majella; Italian
The Majella National Park; English
The association Sfera
 Pages compiled by the Park Authority on the web site Parks.it
 Majella National A map of the National Park
The Company Eni
The Company Statoil (merged with NorskHydro -> Norsk O&G)
 Geological Mapping Project of the Italian Government
 Italian Geological Society

Geology organizations
Geology software
Petroleum geology
Petroleum production
Research institutes in Italy
Research projects
Science and technology in Italy
Structural geology